Redeeming Love is a 1916 American drama silent film directed by William Desmond Taylor and written by Gardner Hunting and L. V. Jefferson. The film stars Kathlyn Williams, Thomas Holding, Wyndham Standing, Herbert Standing, Jane Keckley and Helen Jerome Eddy. The film was released on December 28, 1916, by Paramount Pictures.

Plot

Cast 
Kathlyn Williams as Naomi Sterling
Thomas Holding as John Bancroft
Wyndham Standing as Hugh Wiley
Herbert Standing as James Plymouth
Jane Keckley as Aunt Jessica'
Helen Jerome Eddy as Katie
Don Bailey as McCarthy

Preservation status
The film survives in the Library of Congress collection.

References

External links 
 
 kinotv.com

1916 films
1910s English-language films
Silent American drama films
1916 drama films
Paramount Pictures films
Films directed by William Desmond Taylor
American black-and-white films
American silent feature films
1910s American films